Amdanga Assembly constituency is an assembly constituency in North 24 Parganas district in the Indian state of West Bengal.

Overview
As per orders of the Delimitation Commission, No. 102 Amdanga Assembly constituency is composed of the following: Amdanga  community development block, and Dattapukur I, Dattapukur II and Kashimpur gram panchayats of Barasat I community development block.

Amdanga Assembly constituency is part of No. 15 Barrackpore (Lok Sabha constituency).

Members of Legislative Assembly

Election results

2021

1977-2006
In the 2006 state assembly elections, Abdus Sattar of CPI (M) won the Amdanga assembly seat defeating his nearest rival Rafiqur Rahaman of Trinamool Congress. Contests in most years were multi cornered but only winners and runners are being mentioned. Hashim Abdul Halim of CPI (M) defeated Dr. M. Nuruzzaman of Trinamool Congress in 2001, Md. Rafiqul Islam of Congress in 1996,Idris Ali of Congress in 1991, Asoke Krishna Dutt of Congress in 1987, C.F.Ali of IUML in 1982, and Mira Dutta of Janata Party in 1977. Prior to that the constituency did not exist.

2011
In the 2011 election, Rafiquer Rahaman of Trinamool Congress defeated his nearest rival Abdus Sattar of CPI(M).

.# Swing calculated on Congress+Trinamool Congress vote percentages taken together in 2006.

2016
In the 2016 election, Rafiqur Rahaman of Trinamool Congress defeated his nearest rival Abdus Sattar of CPI(M).

References

Assembly constituencies of West Bengal
Politics of North 24 Parganas district
1977 establishments in West Bengal
Constituencies established in 1977